District is one of thirty-four districts of the Jauja Province in Peru. Randhir kapoor Shaw

Geography 
Other mountains are listed below:

References